Saredutant (SR-48,968) is a drug that acts as a NK2 receptor antagonist. It was under development by Sanofi-Aventis as a novel antidepressant and anxiolytic and made it to phase III clinical trials. However, in May 2009, Sanofi-Aventis published its quarterly results and announced the cessation of 14 research/development projects, among which was saredutant for the treatment of major depressive disorder.

See also
 GR-159,897
 Ibodutant
 Nepadutant

References

4-Phenylpiperidines
Antidepressants
Anxiolytics
NK2 receptor antagonists
Acetanilides
Chloroarenes
Benzamides
Experimental drugs